Cozad may refer to:

 Cozad, Nebraska, city
 Adam Cozad, screenwriter
 Amy Cozad (born 1991), American diver
 Irene Cozad (1888–1970), American pianist
 Kyle Cozad, military officer

See also
 Cozad–Bates House, historic building in Ohio
 Cozad Singers, drum group